Judith May Warnick (née Knapp, born May 28, 1950) is an American politician who is a member of the Republican Party. She is a member of the Washington State Senate, representing the 13th Legislative District since 2015. She was a member of the Washington House of Representatives, from 2007-2015.

Awards 
 2020 Guardians of Small Business. Presented by NFIB.

Personal life 
Warnick's husband is Roy. They have three children. Warnick and her family live in Moses Lake, Washington.

References

External links 
 Judith Warnick at ballotpedia.org

1950 births
Living people
Republican Party members of the Washington House of Representatives
Republican Party Washington (state) state senators
Women state legislators in Washington (state)
21st-century American politicians
21st-century American women politicians
People from Deer Park, Washington